The Lane Fire was a wildfire in Paynes Creek, California in the United States. During its height, the fire threatened 200 structures.

Events

The Lane Fire was reported around 11:35 A.M. PDT on June 23, 2018, just off Highway 36 in Paynes Creek, California. Power was intentionally shut off by Pacific Gas & Electric. The evacuation center at Mineral Elementary School was moved to Red Bluff Community Center due to expanded evacuations, which in the evening totaled 200 individuals. 

All evacuation orders were lifted on July 1. On July 2, the fire had burned . Only July 4, the Lane Fire was fully contained, with no further increases in size.

References

June 2018 events in the United States
Tehama County, California
2018 California wildfires
Wildfires in Tehama County, California